Dragan Stojkov (born on 23 February 1988) is a Macedonian professional footballer.

Club career
Born in Strumica, after playing in his homeland club FK Belasica, and an unsuccessful journey in South Korea on loan for the K1 league side Incheon United FC in 2007, in January 2008 he moved to Greece to play the rest of the season in Egaleo F.C. Next, he moved to Ilisiakos F.C., where he played the 2008–09 season. In summer 2009 he moved to Serbia to play in the Serbian Superliga club FK Napredak Kruševac. At the end of the season, he moved to FK Jagodina where he played total of 63 games making the biggest success of the club's history, two years in a row finishing fourth and third in the league standings, playing twice in Europa League qualification and winning the Serbian Cup in 2013 for the first time in the club's history. Playing a total of four seasons in the Serbian Superliga Serbian top league, he continued his career in the United States.

After spending 2014 with LA Galaxy II, Stojkov signed for Indy Eleven on 29 November 2014. Stojkov started 18 of 21 games played for the Eleven during the 2015 NASL season, logging 1,412 minutes, 3 assists and 4 yellow cards. He mutually terminated his contract with Indy on 30 March 2016.

On 5 January 2017, he signed with USL Team Saint Louis FC. In June 2018 he returned to his parent-club FK Belasica which this year entered Macedonian First Football League.

International career
Stojkov had played in the Macedonia national under-19 national team before started playing in the Macedonia national under-21 football team in 2006. His last call up was in a convocation for a friendly in January 2009.

In November 2005, being only aged 17, he received a call to join Macedonian national team for a friendly match against Liechtenstein. However, he was an unused substitute. Later during 2006 national team coach Boban Babunski counted on him, however ever since he never got the chance to make a debut.

Honours
Jagodina
Serbian Cup: 2013

References

External links
Profile and stats at Srbijafudbal. 
Macedonian Football 
Dragan Stojkov Stats at Utakmica.rs

1988 births
Living people
Sportspeople from Strumica
Association football midfielders
Macedonian footballers
North Macedonia youth international footballers
North Macedonia under-21 international footballers
FK Belasica players
Egaleo F.C. players
Ilisiakos F.C. players
FK Napredak Kruševac players
FK Jagodina players
LA Galaxy II players
Indy Eleven players
Saint Louis FC players
FK Rabotnički players
Gamma Ethniki players
FK Tikvesh players
Football League (Greece) players
Serbian SuperLiga players
USL Championship players
North American Soccer League players
Macedonian First Football League players
Macedonian expatriate footballers
Expatriate footballers in Greece
Macedonian expatriate sportspeople in Greece
Expatriate footballers in Serbia
Macedonian expatriate sportspeople in Serbia
Expatriate soccer players in the United States
Macedonian expatriate sportspeople in the United States